This is a list of high school association member conferences in the state of Michigan.

Class A

Big North Conference
Capital Area Activities Conference
Catholic High School League
Detroit Public School League
Downriver League
Flint Metro League
Kensington Lakes Activities Association
Lakes Valley Conference
Macomb Area Conference
Oakland Activities Association
Ottawa-Kent Conference
Saginaw Valley League
Southeastern Conference
Southwestern Michigan Athletic Conference
Tri-Valley Conference
Western Wayne Athletic Conference

Class B

BCS League
Blue Water Area Conference
Capital Area Activities Conference
Catholic High School League (AA Div.)
Central State Activities Association
Charter School Conference
Detroit Public School League
Genesee Area Conference
Great Northern UP Conference
Greater Lansing Activities Conference
Huron League
Independent
Interstate 8 Athletic Conference
Lakes 8 Activities Conference
Lenawee County Athletic Association
Macomb Area Conference
Michigan Metro Athletic Conference
Northern Michigan Football Conference
Ottawa-Kent Conference
Southern Michigan Football Conference
Southwestern Michigan Athletic Conference
Straits Area Conference
Tri-Valley Conference
West Michigan Conference
West-Pac Conference
Wolverine Conference

Class C

BCS League
Big 8 Conference
Cascades Conference
Catholic High School League
Central Michigan 8-Man
Central Michigan Athletic Conference
Central State Activities Association (Silver Div.)
Charter School Conference
Detroit Public School League
Genesee Area Conference
Greater Thumb Conference 
Highland Conference
Jack Pine Conference
Kalamazoo Valley Association
Lake Michigan Conference
Lakeland Athletic Conference
Lenawee County Athletic Association
Macomb Area Conference
Metro Conference
Michigan Independent Athletic Conference
Mid-Eastern Football Conference
Mid-Peninsula Athletic Conference
Mid-State Activities Conference South
North Central Thumb 8-Man League
North Star League
Northern Michigan Football Conference
Northwest Conference
Ottawa-Kent Conference
Red Arrow Conference
Southern Central Athletic Association
Southern Michigan Football Conference
Southwestern Athletic Conference
Straits Area Conference
Tri-County Conference
West Michigan Conference
West-Pac
Western Michigan 'D' League

Class D

Alliance League
BCS League
Big 8 Conference
Bridge Alliance 8 Man
Catholic High School League (Intersectional 2)
Central Michigan Athletic Conference
Christian Football League
Great Western Conference
Independent
Lakes 8 Activities Conference
Lenawee County Athletic Association
Michigan Independent Athletic Conference
Mid-Eastern Football Conference
Mid-Michigan 8-Man Football League
Mid-State Activities Conference South
North Central Thumb 8-Man League
North Star League
Northern Michigan Football Conference
Northwest Conference
Red Arrow Conference
Skii Valley Conference
Southern Central Athletic Association
Southern Michigan 8-Man Football League
Southern Michigan Football Conference
Southwestern Athletic Conference (North Div.)
Tri-Valley Conference
Western Michigan 'D' League

See also 
List of high schools in Michigan

External links
Michigan High School Athletic Association
Michigan 11-man football conferences
Michigan 8-man football conferences

References 

 
Education in Michigan
High school sports associations in the United States
High School Association member conferences